Elizabeth Percy, Duchess of Northumberland (née Seymour; 26 November 1716 – 5 December 1776), also suo jure 2nd Baroness Percy, was a British peer.

Life
Percy was the only daughter of Algernon Seymour, 7th Duke of Somerset, and his wife, Frances, daughter of Henry Thynne.

On 16 July 1740, she married Sir Hugh Smithson, Bt, and they had two sons, Hugh (1742–1817) and Algernon (1750–1830). On her father's death in 1750, she inherited his barony of Percy and her husband acquired from her father his earldom of Northumberland by special remainder and changed his family name from Smithson to Percy that year. Sir Hugh's illegitimate son James Smithson, otherwise Jacques Louis Macie, born in about 1764 to one of Elizabeth's cousins, bequeathed the fortune which established the Smithsonian Institution.

In 1761, Percy became a Lady of the Bedchamber to Queen Charlotte, a post she held until 1770. She became a duchess in 1766 when her husband was created Duke of Northumberland, and on her death in 1776, aged sixty, her barony and the earldom of Northumberland passed to her eldest son, Hugh, who inherited his father's dukedom ten years later. He built Brizlee Tower as one of a number of monuments to commemorate her.

Their children were:

 Lady Elizabeth Percy, who died unmarried
 General Hugh Percy, 2nd Duke of Northumberland (1742-1817)
 Algernon Percy, 1st Earl of Beverley (1750-1830)

Elizabeth Percy is buried in the Northumberland Vault, within Westminster Abbey. Her epitaph describes her as having "every amiable & benevolent virtue", and as "an ornament of courts, an honour to her country, & patern to the great, a protectress of the poor, ever distinguished for the most tender affection for her family & friends". The monument was erected by her husband, who is described as "inconsolable".

In 1775, her diary of her travels in the Dutch Republic, called "A Short Tour made in the Year One Thousand Seven Hundred and Seventy One" was published, although anonymously. Extracts from her lively, entertaining and historically informative diary were published in 1936.

The National Portrait Gallery holds several mezzotints based on portraits of the duchess by Sir Joshua Reynolds. A watercolour portrait by Richard Gibson is held by the Fitzwilliam Museum, Cambridge.

Ancestry

References

1716 births
1776 deaths
Percy, Elizabeth Percy, 2nd Baroness
Elizabeth
Daughters of English dukes
Wives of knights
Hereditary women peers
Elizabeth
Elizabeth
Ladies of the Bedchamber
Burials at Westminster Abbey
Place of birth missing
Place of death missing
Court of George III of the United Kingdom
18th-century diarists